Riner is a census-designated place in Montgomery County, Virginia, United States. The population as of the 2020 Census was 1,196.

The Howard-Bell-Feather House and Riner Historic District are listed on the National Register of Historic Places.

Auburn Elementary School, Auburn Middle School, and Auburn High School  are all located in Riner.
Camp Carysbrook  is the oldest overnight camp for girls in Virginia since 1923.

References

Census-designated places in Montgomery County, Virginia
Census-designated places in Virginia